Base or BASE may refer to:

Brands and enterprises
Base (mobile telephony provider), a Belgian mobile telecommunications operator
Base CRM, an enterprise software company founded in 2009 with offices in Mountain View and Kraków, Poland
Base Design, an international design, communications, audiovisual, copywriting and publishing firm
Base FX, a visual effects and animation company founded in 2006 with studios in Beijing, Wuxi and Xiamen, China
Budapest Aircraft Services, callsign BASE

Computing
BASE (search engine), Bielefeld Academic Search Engine
, an HTML element
Basically Available, Soft state, Eventual consistency (BASE), a consistency model
Google Base, an online database provided by Google
LibreOffice Base, LibreOffice's  database module
OpenOffice.org Base, OpenOffice.org's database module, also known as ooBase

Mathematics
Base of computation, commonly called radix, the number of distinct digits in a positional numeral system
Base of a logarithm, the number whose logarithm is 
Base (exponentiation), the number  in an expression of the form 
Base (geometry), a side of a plane figure (for example a triangle) or face of a solid
Base (group theory), a sequence of elements not jointly stabilized by any nontrivial group element.
Base (topology), a type of generating set for a topological space

Organizations
Backward Society Education, a Nepali non-governmental organization
BASE (social centre), a self-managed social centre in Bristol, UK
Beaverton Academy of Science and Engineering, part of Beaverton School District in Hillsboro, Oregon, US
Bible Archaeology Search and Exploration Institute
British Association for Screen Entertainment
Brooklyn Academy of Science and the Environment, a high school in New York, US

Science and technology
Base (chemistry), a substance that can accept hydrogen ions (protons)
Base, an attribute to medication in pure form, for example erythromycin base
Base, one of the three terminals of a Bipolar junction transistor
BASE experiment, an antiproton experiment at CERN
Base pair, a pair of connected nucleotides on complementary DNA and RNA strands
Beta-alumina solid electrolyte, a fast ion conductor material
Nucleobase, in genetics, the parts of DNA and RNA involved in forming base pairs

Social science
Base (politics), a group of voters who almost always support a single party's candidates
Base (social class), a lower social class
Base and superstructure (Marxism), parts of society in Marxist theory

Sports
Base (baseball), a station that must be touched by a runner
Base, a position in some cheerleading stunts
BASE jumping, parachuting or wingsuit flying from a fixed structure or cliff
Base, a variant name for the children's game darebase

Other uses
Base (character), character in Marvel Comics
Base (EP), an album by South Korean singer Kim Jonghyun
Base, Maharashtra, a village in India
Rob Base, American rapper
Base, or binder (material), a material that holds paint or other materials together
Base, or foundation (architecture), the lowest and supporting layer of a structure
Base, or foundation (cosmetics), a cosmetic applied to the face
Base, in heraldry, the lower part of the shield
Base, or pedestal, a supporting feature of a statue or other item
Cooking base, a concentrated flavouring compound
Military base, or non-military base camp, a bivouac which provides shelter, military equipment and personnel

See also

Base camp (disambiguation)
Bases (disambiguation)
Basis (disambiguation)
Bass (disambiguation)
Bottom (disambiguation)
Radix (disambiguation)
The Base (disambiguation)